The 2017–18 UAE President's Cup was the 42nd edition of the UAE President's Cup. The competition started on 22 September 2017 and concluded on 3 May 2018. Al Ain defeated Al Wasl 2–1 in the finals to win their seventh title. 

Al-Wahda were the defending champions, winning the tournament in 2016–17 season, they were knocked out in semi-finals, after losing 5–4 on penalties to Al Wasl.

Group stage

Preliminary Group A

Preliminary Group B

|}

Bracket
As per UAE Football Association matches database:

Round 1

Quarterfinals

Semifinals

Final

References

UAE President's Cup seasons
2017–18 in Emirati football